Cyrestis is a butterfly genus in the family Nymphalidae. They are known as map butterflies, so named because the wing-markings of some species resemble the lines of latitude and longitude of a world map. Cyrestis is a widespread genus ranging from Africa to parts of the Indomalayan realm and parts of the Australasian realm (New Guinea).

Species
Cyrestis achates Butler, 1865
Cyrestis acilia (Godart, [1824])
Cyrestis andamanensis Staudinger
Cyrestis adaemon Godman & Salvin, 1879
Cyrestis camillus (Fabricius, 1781)
Cyrestis cassander C. & R. Felder, 1863
Cyrestis cocles (Fabricius, 1787)
Cyrestis heracles Staudinger, 1896
Cyrestis irmae Forbes, 1885
Cyrestis kudrati Jumalon, 1975
Cyrestis lutea (Zinken, 1831)
Cyrestis maenalis Erichson, 1834
Cyrestis nais Wallace, 1869
Cyrestis nivea (Zinken, 1831)
Cyrestis paulinus C. & R. Felder, 1860
Cyrestis tabula de Nicéville, 1883
Cyrestis telamon (Linnaeus, 1758)
Cyrestis themire Honrath, [1884]
Cyrestis theresae de Nicéville, 1894
Cyrestis thyodamas Boisduval, 1846
Cyrestis thyonneus (Cramer, [1779])

References

External links

 images  representing  Cyrestis  at  Consortium for the Barcode of Life

Cyrestinae
Nymphalidae genera
Taxa named by Jean Baptiste Boisduval